Robert George Winsor (1876 – June 1, 1929) was a fisherman and political figure in Newfoundland. He represented Bonavista Bay from 1913 to 1924 and Bonavista North from 1928 to 1929 in the Newfoundland House of Assembly as a member of the Fishermen's Protective Union.

He was born in Wesleyville, the son of George Winsor. Winsor ended his schooling at the age of twelve to become a fisherman, later becoming captain of a schooner working in the Labrador fishery. He served as chairman of the FPU council in Wesleyville and for the Bonavista district. Winsor married Alice Whiteway. He was manager of the Union Trading Company at Newtown from 1912 to 1919. In 1919, he opened his own business, including a sawmill, near Wesleyville. Winsor retired from politics in 1924, but ran unsuccessfully in a 1924 by-election held after two elected representatives for Bonavista Bay were named to the Executive Council. Winsor was elected again in 1928, defeating William C. Winsor. He died in office in St. John's the following year.

References 
 

Fishermen's Protective Union MHAs
1876 births
1929 deaths
Dominion of Newfoundland politicians